Kanak Pal Paramara known as Raja Kanakpal of Paramara dynasty, was the founder of Garhwal Kingdom and the first independent ruler of the entire Garhwal state. He possible reigned in 822 AD or earlier.

Life and background 
Kanak Pal was primarily a prince of Paramara dynasty, belonging to Malwa or in modern-day Madhya Pradesh. He was on Garhwal's journey to fulfill mandatory religious duties of Pilgrimage. The state reigning king "Bhanu Pratap", was influenced by him and he placed Kalank Pal on the throne of Garhwal. Before Pal's coronation came into existence, the entire kingdom was split into small parts. After some time spending on the throne, he started conquering divided parts and ultimately, led the foundation of Garhwal Kingdom and merged the bifurcated parts into one.

Diplomacy
The practice of arranging administrative reforms were not much different from other rulers. Before entering in the state, the divided-territory was ruled by several independent families known as "Rana", "Thakur" and "Rai". When he stabilized his throne diplomatically with the help of his descendants, he emerged as the one independent king by conquering the other parts.

Marriage
The foundation of Garhwal Kingdom began when he married Bhanu Pratap's daughter. When reigning king "Bhanu Pratap", was searching a groom for his daughter, he was reported about the Kanak Pal's presence at the Badrinath temple where prince was performing religious duties. Pratap offered a marriage proposal to prince to marry his daughter but he declined citing some issues. Upon introducing to princess, he couldn't prevent himself from accepting the proposal and ultimately agreed to marry his daughter. After getting married, the responsibilities of Garhwal Kingdom was taken by Kanak.

References 

Indian monarchs
8th-century Indian monarchs